Campos e Louredo (officially: União das Freguesias de Campos e Louredo) is a  in the municipality of Póvoa de Lanhoso, Portugal. It has an area of 5.87 km² and 1,485 inhabitants (2011).

It was created during the administrative reorganization of 2012/2013, from the previous parishes Campos and Louredo.

References 

Freguesias of Póvoa de Lanhoso